Venevere may refer to several places in Estonia:
Venevere, Lääne-Viru County, village in Estonia
Venevere, Viljandi County, village in Estonia